XPQ-21 are a German electronic body music band, led by Jeyênne. They are best known for their club hit "White And Alive", a hit on the Deutsche Alternative Charts in 2002,,"Rockin' Silver Knight" and "Dead Body", DAC hits in 2006.

History 

XPQ-21 is first and foremost Jeyênne. Mastermind, producer and singer. Enfant terrible and Techno Raver of the first hour. Jeyênne started in the German dance music scene as a hiphop DJ in 1987, later moving to techno. He started recording under his own name in 1992.

In the 90s as The Jeyênne, one of the greats in the rave and techno scene, with numerous vinyl and CD releases. Touring with Prodigy and Moby, DJing at festivals with greats like Carl Cox, Richie Hawtin, Ellen Allien... With appearances on MTV and VIVA TV, Mayday, Loveparade and much more. From the 2000s onwards, touring the USA and Europe and mutating into electro-industrial-dnb-cyberpunk-goth with XPQ-21. 

In 1995 he met former member Nicque and formed XPQ-21 as a duo. They released their first single A Gothic Novel in 1998 and their album Destroy To Create in 1999.

Nicque left in 2003 and the band since then has been Jeyênne with backing members. Live members have included Annelie Bertilsson (Cat Rapes Dog, And One) who first replaced Nicque, Martin Hillebrand, Moritz Zielke and Alex Gsell. 

After a long break and several other projects by Jeyênne, XPQ-21 are back 2022 with the new single Machines (on their own label Monsters & Heroes).

Machines builds the bridge between their past album ALIVE and XPQ-21 from here and now. A downtempo-industrial-cyber-goth track about a science fiction that is no longer a fiction.
In April 2022 Machines climb the Deutsche Alternative Charts (DAC) (German Alternative Charts) to No. 2.

On 27 January 2023 XPQ-21 release the next single Temptation after their long break. The single was already catapulted from 0 to 1 in the DAC charts in the second week of January.

Jeyênne is currently working on the 5th XPQ-21 album to be released in summer of 2023.

Instruments 

Jeyênne combines analogue synthesizers (Korg Monopoly, Roland 909, 808, 101, Roland TB 303) with digital gear and sequencing on Apple Macintosh, typically working in Logic Pro, now Ableton Live. He also works with software from native instruments, soundtoys, fabfilters, audiorealism, intelligent sounds and music, vital, u-he, valhalla and D16.

Related activities 

Jeyênne has run the EMS - Electronic Music School in Cologne since 2010 and Berlin since 2011. The XPQ-21 studio is also located in the school's building in Berlin.

Name 

The name "XPQ-21" was originally the title of a song, as "a combination of letters that mean a lot to me ... it was the first hit/club hit, and later we thought: 'Okay, let's make it a band name.'"

Discography

Albums
Destroy To Create (CD, Fourbiddentones FBT-002-CD, 1999)
Belle Epoque (CD, Bloodline LINECD-012, October 2000)
 Chi (CD, Dying Culture CULT006-2, 22 August 2002)
 Alive (CD, Trisol TRI-261-CD, 24 March 2006)
 "Rockin' Silver Night" DAC 7 weeks, peak no. 9; no. 88 for 2006
 "Dead Body" DAC 6 weeks, peak no. 10; no. 97 for 2006

Singles
 "A Gothic Novel (Science Fiction)" (9:30) / "A Gothic Novel (Body Version)" (6:04) // "Pornography (FuckU)" (5:09) / "Pornography (Cy's Version)" (6:24) (12", Fourbiddentones FBT-001, September 1998; CD, Bloodline LINECD-026, August 2000)
 "Hey You (Edit)" (4:00) / "Hey You (Nicque's Version)" (7:34) / "Hey You (Belle Version)" (6:14) / "Ghost" (7:08) / "Another Playground" (6:33) / "Sequencial" (6:57) (CD, Bloodline LINECD-053, April 2001)
 "White and Alive (Club Version)" (5:43) / "White and Alive (Wollschläger Remix)" (7:41) / "White and Alive (S.P.O.C.K Remix)" (6:54) / "Israel" (9:38) / "White and Alive (Original Version)" (5:12) (CD, Dying Culture CULT004-5, 12 July 2002)
 DAC 8 weeks, peak No. 4; No. 32 for 2002
 "Machines - Original" (4.10) / "Machines - Club Version" (5:48) DAC 5 weeks, peak No. 2;
 "Temptation - Original" (4.53) / DAC peak No. 1;

Compilation appearances 

 "Monster" (5:52) on Electronic Lust V.1 (2×CD, Orkus EFA-61606-02, 1998)

References

External links
XPQ-21 official website
XPQ-21 on Instagram

German electronic music groups